Nina Viktorovna Pigulevskaya (13 January 1894 in St. Petersburg – 17 February 1970 in Leningrad) was Russian historian and orientalist. A graduate of the Saint Petersburg State University, she began working at the Russian Academy of Sciences in 1934, and by 1937 was working at the Institute of Oriental Studies of the Russian Academy of Sciences, later teaching at the Saint Petersburg State University from 1944 to 1951. She was made vice president of the Imperial Orthodox Palestine Society in 1952, and was a member of the Société Asiatique since 1960. She was invested with the Order of the Red Banner of Labour and twice invested with the Order of the Badge of Honour by the Soviet Union.

References 

1894 births
1970 deaths
Soviet women historians
Soviet historians
Soviet orientalists
Soviet professors
Writers from Saint Petersburg
Soviet Byzantinists